George Kenneth William Greatrex (date of birth unknown) was a professional footballer who played as a goalkeeper. He made appearances in the English Football League for Wrexham.

References

Date of birth unknown
Date of death unknown
Association football goalkeepers
English Football League players
Marine F.C. players
Burscough F.C. players
Wrexham A.F.C. players
New Brighton A.F.C. players
Crewe Alexandra F.C. players
Workington A.F.C. players
Runcorn F.C. Halton players
Manchester North End F.C. players
English footballers